Layang-Layang is a town in Kluang District, Johor, Malaysia. It is situated within the parliamentary constituency of Simpang Renggam.

It is located approximately 72 km north of Johor Bahru and 32 km south of Kluang.

It was developed in the early 20th century and became one of the Chinese new villages during the military conflict between Malaya Communists and the Britain colonial government.

Until the 1990s, Layang-Layang's major community was Chinese, but it is gradually transforming to a Malay major community following the outflow of the Chinese young generation, who commonly have a trend of settling in cities such as Johor Bahru, Kuala Lumpur and Singapore for higher income and better opportunities.

Etymology
Layang-layang is the Malay word for "kite". More specifically, a traditional type of kite which is flown in Malaysia and Indonesia.

Economy
The town's economy is centered on plantations and agriculture. The connectivity through rail is a predominant factor for its existence despite being out of the main trunk road linking the southern part of Peninsular Malaysia. Well known plantations owned by corporations in this area are the Ulu Remis Estate (owned by the Guthrie Corporation in the 1960s and now by the Sime Darby Group), Sembrong Estate, CEP Renggam Estate and many smaller plantations owned by individuals.

Transportation
Layang-Layang is served by the Layang-Layang railway station.

Kluang District
Towns in Johor